Zip Code Rapists were an avant-garde band active in the 1990s. The band was composed of guitarist John Singer and singer Gregg Turkington. The band is known for their confrontational, deconstructionist, absurd live performances, as well as their bizarre, more fleshed-out recordings. During the group's fake break-up in 1994, Singer and Turkington formed competing spin-off bands, the Zip Code Revue and The Three Doctors Band, presumably attempts to siphon off Zip Code Rapists fans for themselves.

In 1996, after a Japanese tour with Faxed Head, the Zip Code Rapists ceased performing or recording.  Gregg Turkington has since gone on to perform as the anti-comedy personality Neil Hamburger. John Singer continues to make music in Vermont. The Zip Code Rapists reunited for a handful of shows in California and in Canada in 2005–2006, followed by a retrospective CD release on the Eabla label in 2009. In 2015 they did a one-off show in Brooklyn, New York.

Discography
The band released the following albums:

Studio albums
Sing and Play the Three Doctors and Other Sounds of Today (1992, Amarillo / 2009, Eabla)

EPs
The Man Can't Bust Our Music! (1993, Ectoplasm)
Sing and Play the Madator Records Catalog (1994, Ecstatic Piss)
94124 (1995, Amarillo)

Live albums
Live "In Competence" Beast 666
Here at Last... Live!!! Freedom from 2005

References

External links
 Zip Code Rapists on Myspace

Rock music groups from California
Musical groups established in 1991
Musical groups disestablished in 1996
1991 establishments in California